8600 may refer to:
 The year 8600, in the 9th millennium.
 NVIDIA GeForce 8600, a computer graphics card series
 8600 series, a Japanese train type
 Nokia 8600 Luna, a mobile phone released in 2007